Svend Aage Grønvold (13 December 1903 – 8 December 1969) was a Danish rower. He competed in the men's eight event at the 1928 Summer Olympics.

References

1903 births
1969 deaths
Danish male rowers
Olympic rowers of Denmark
Rowers at the 1928 Summer Olympics
Rowers from Copenhagen